Arrachart Airport  is an airport located near Antsiranana (formerly Diego-Suárez) in Madagascar.

Created before the Second World War as Camp Arrachart, a French military and civilian air facility, the airport was named after Ludovic Arrachart, a French aviator and pioneer of intercontinental flying, who made one of the first postal flights between France and Madagascar and died in an accident in 1933. The French air force (Armée de l'air) left in 1973.

Airlines and destinations

References

External links
 
 

Airports in Madagascar
Diana Region